This article lists events that occurred during 1933 in Estonia.

Incumbents
Head of State – Konstantin Päts
Head of State – Jaan Tõnisson

Events
14 October – plebiscite in favour of constitutional reform giving wide powers to a new office of the president. (to 16 October)
War of Independence Veterans' League emerges and enters into politics.

Births
13 December – Feliks Kark, Estonian actor

Deaths

  December 26 - Eduard Vilde, Estonian writer (b. 1865)

References

 
1930s in Estonia
Estonia
Estonia
Years of the 20th century in Estonia